William Veirs Bouic (July 20, 1846 – October 12, 1906) was an American lawyer and politician, a member of the Maryland State Senate.

Biography
Born near Rockville, Maryland, the only son of William Veirs Bouic, a long-time judge of the Maryland Sixth Judicial Circuit.  Bouic attended Rockville Academy and graduated from Columbian College (now, George Washington University) in 1868 with an A.B. degree and received his A.M. in 1871. He was admitted to the Maryland bar in 1870, generally representing the B & O Railroad locally.  Politically, he was a Democrat.  He was a presidential elector in the 1892 presidential election. He was mayor of Rockville for 17 years. In 1897, he was elected to the Maryland State Senate. He served as president of The Farmers Banking and Trust Company from 1900 until his death at Rockville in 1906.

References

American lawyers
Democratic Party Maryland state senators
1846 births
1906 deaths
People from Rockville, Maryland
Columbian College of Arts and Sciences alumni